The Tama Lakes are two crater lakes in New Zealand's Tongariro National Park. They fill two (Upper and Lower Tama) of a series of explosion craters on the Tama Saddle between Mount Ruapehu and Mount Ngaruahoe (a main Mount Tongariro vent).

See also
List of volcanoes in New Zealand

External links
Aerial photo of the Tama Lakes

Tongariro Volcanic Centre
Volcanoes of Manawatū-Whanganui
Volcanic crater lakes